Earl F. "Buddy" Hance (born July 17, 1955), is an American politician who served as Secretary of the Maryland Department of Agriculture in the Cabinet of Governor Martin O'Malley from May 2009 to January 2015, after serving as Deputy Secretary of the Maryland Department of Agriculture beginning in February 2007.

Early life 
Hance was born in Prince Frederick, Maryland. He graduated from Calvert High School. In 1973, he joined the Prince Frederick Volunteer Fire Department.

Career 
From 2003 to 2007, Hance served as the President of the Maryland Farm Bureau. From 2004 to 2007, he served on the board of directors of the American Farm Bureau Federation. In February 2007, Hance was appointed Maryland's Deputy Secretary of Agriculture. In May 2009, Hance became Secretary of Agriculture of Maryland. He held this post in the Cabinet of Governor Martin O'Malley until 2015.

In 2018, Hance was elected to a seat on the Calvert County Board of County Commissioners.

Personal life 
A fourth-generation family farmer, he owns a 600-acre farm in Port Republic, Maryland, growing corn and soybean crops, and previously tobacco. He is married with three children.

References

1955 births
Living people
County commissioners in Maryland
State cabinet secretaries of Maryland
Maryland Department of Agriculture
Farmers from Maryland
People from Prince Frederick, Maryland
Maryland Republicans